Curtești is a commune in Botoșani County, Western Moldavia, Romania. It is composed of seven villages: Agafton, Băiceni, Curtești, Hudum, Mănăstirea Doamnei, Orășeni-Deal and Orășeni-Vale.

Natives
 Nicolae Leon

References

Communes in Botoșani County
Localities in Western Moldavia